The Evangelical Lutheran Church in Zimbabwe (formerly the Evangelical Lutheran Church of Southern Rhodesia) is an Evangelical Lutheran church in Zimbabwe, founded in 1903 by Swedish and South African missionaries. It has a membership of around 134,000 (as of 2006) and is a member of the Lutheran World Federation. Until 1934, it was a branch of the Swedish Lutheran mission in South Africa. It became an independent church in 1963, as the Evangelical Lutheran Church of Southern Rhodesia. Its last missionary bishop was Sigfrid Strandvik, who retired in 1975. He was succeeded by a Zimbabwean, J. C. Shiri.

Literature
Hugo Söderström: God Gave Growth. The History of the Lutheran Church in Zimbabwe, 1903-1980, 1984.
Hugo Söderström, Sten Bergman, Tore Bergman: The History of the Evangelical Lutheran Church in Zimbabwe 1903-2003, Church of Sweden, 2003. ,  https://web.archive.org/web/20160304220513/http://www.fjellstedtska.se/ELCZ_100years.pdf

References

Lutheranism in Africa
Protestantism in Zimbabwe
1903 establishments in Southern Rhodesia
Lutheran World Federation members